Pont-Noyelles is a commune in the Somme department in Hauts-de-France in northern France.

Geography

Population

History
Pont-Noyelles was the scene of one of the battles of the Franco-Prussian War. On 23 and  24 December 1870, French troops, led by Colonel Louis Faidherbe routed German forces led by Edwin Freiherr von Manteuffel at the Battle of Hallue.
A memorial at the site of the General's headquarters commemorates the battle.

See also
Communes of the Somme department

References

Communes of Somme (department)